Lautensack is a surname. Notable people with the surname include:

Hanns Lautensack (1524– 1560), German painter and etcher
Heinrich Lautensack (1522–1590), German painter and goldsmith
Paul Lautensack (1478–1558), German painter and organist, father of Hanns Lautensack and Heinrich Lautensack